Bobbie Jo Stinnett (December 4, 1981 – December 16, 2004) was an American 23-year-old pregnant woman who was murdered in Skidmore, Missouri in December 2004. The perpetrator, Lisa Marie Montgomery, then aged 36-years-old, strangled Stinnett to death and cut her fetus (eight months into gestation) from her womb. Montgomery was arrested in Kansas the next day and charged with kidnapping resulting in death – a federal crime. Stinnett's baby was safely recovered by authorities and returned to the father.
 
Despite deep concerns over a lifetime of sexual and physical abuse from which she was never protected, and clear signs that she was deeply mentally ill, Montgomery was tried and found guilty in 2007. She was executed by lethal injection shortly after midnight on January 13, 2021, having exhausted the appeals process. Montgomery became the first female federal inmate since 1953 to be executed by the United States federal government, and the fourth overall.

Background 
Bobbie Jo Stinnett was born on December 4, 1981 and graduated from Nodaway-Holt High School in Graham, Missouri, in 2000. Stinnett and her husband ran a dog-breeding business from their residence in Skidmore.

Stinnett and Montgomery had met through dog show events and had ongoing interactions in an online Rat Terrier chatroom called Ratter Chatter. Montgomery told Stinnett that she was pregnant too, leading to the two women chatting online and exchanging e-mails about their pregnancies.

Murder and investigation 
On December 16, 2004, Montgomery entered Stinnett's house and murdered her by strangulation. Montgomery then cut Stinnett's unborn child from her womb and fled the scene. There was no sign of forced entry; authorities believe that Montgomery, posing as customer "Darlene Fischer", had arranged to visit Stinnett's house on that day. It is known that Stinnett was expecting the arrival in Skidmore of prospective buyers for a terrier at about the time of her murder.

Stinnett was discovered by her mother Becky Harper, lying in a pool of blood, approximately an hour after the murder. Harper immediately called authorities and described the wounds inflicted upon her daughter as appearing as if her "stomach had exploded." Paramedics were unsuccessful in attempts to revive Stinnett, and she was pronounced dead at St. Francis Hospital in Maryville. Montgomery allegedly called her husband, Kevin, that same day around 5:15 p.m. saying that, on a shopping trip to Topeka, she had gone into labor and given birth.

The following day, December 17, police arrested Montgomery at her farmhouse in Melvern, Kansas. A witness would later report that on the morning before her arrest, Montgomery took the infant, her husband, and two teenage sons to a restaurant for breakfast. Police had initially gone to Montgomery's home after tracing online communications to her IP address, hoping to interview her as a witness. When they arrived, they found a car matching the description of the one at the crime scene, and when they entered the home, they found Montgomery inside, holding the infant, and watching television. Montgomery was arrested an hour later after her story fell apart and she confessed. The kidnapped newborn, whom she claimed as her own, was recovered and soon placed in custody of the father. The quick recovery and capture was attributed to the use of forensic computer investigations which tracked Montgomery and Stinnett's online communication.

The investigation was aided by the issuance of an AMBER alert to enlist the public's help. The alert was initially denied as it had not been used before in an unborn child's case and thus there was no description of the victim. Eventually after intervention by Congressman Sam Graves, the alert was implemented. DNA testing was used to confirm the infant's identity.

Perpetrator 

Lisa Marie Montgomery (February 27, 1968 – January 13, 2021) resided in Melvern, Kansas, at the time of the murder. Montgomery's mother's alcohol addiction led to Lisa being born with permanent brain damage. She was raised in a physically, emotionally, and sexually abusive home where she was allegedly raped by her stepfather and his friends, and beaten, from the age of 11. She sought mental escape through drinking alcohol. When Montgomery was 14, her mother discovered the abuse and reacted by threatening her daughter with a gun. Montgomery tried to escape by marrying at the age of 18, but both her first marriage and a second marriage resulted in further abuse.

Montgomery had four children before she underwent a tubal ligation in 1990. She falsely claimed to be pregnant several times after the procedure, according to both her first and second spouses.

At the time of her arrest, it was speculated that Montgomery's motivation stemmed from a miscarriage she may have suffered and subsequently concealed from her family. Further possibilities surrounding her motive were raised following speculation that her former husband planned to reveal she had lied about being pregnant in an effort to get custody of her children; it was surmised that Montgomery needed to produce a baby to counter this charge of habitual lying about pregnancy.

Trial and ruling 
Montgomery was charged with the federal offense of "kidnapping resulting in death", a crime established by the Federal Kidnapping Act of 1932, and described in Title 18 of the United States Code. If convicted, she faced a sentence of life imprisonment or the death penalty.

At a pre-trial hearing, a neuropsychologist testified that head injuries which Montgomery had sustained some years before could have damaged the part of the brain that controls aggression. During her trial in federal court, her defense attorneys, led by Frederick Duchardt, asserted that she had pseudocyesis, a mental condition that causes a woman to falsely believe she is pregnant and exhibit outward signs of pregnancy. According to The Guardian, Duchardt attempted to follow this line of defense only one week before the trial began after being forced to abandon a contradictory argument that Stinnett was murdered by Montgomery's brother Tommy, who had an alibi. As a result, Montgomery's family refused to co-operate with Duchardt and described her background to the jury.

Dr. V. S. Ramachandran and MD William Logan gave expert testimony that Montgomery had pseudocyesis in addition to depression, borderline personality disorder, and post-traumatic stress disorder. Ramachandran testified that Montgomery's stories about her actions fluctuated because of her delusional state and that she was unable to dictate the nature and quality of her acts. Both federal prosecutor Roseann Ketchmark and the opposing expert witness forensic psychiatrist Park Dietz disagreed strongly with the diagnosis of pseudocyesis.

On October 22, 2007, jurors found Montgomery guilty, rejecting the defense claim that Montgomery was delusional. On October 26, the jury recommended the death sentence. Judge Gary A. Fenner formally sentenced Montgomery to death on April 4, 2008.

Duchardt's pseudocyesis defense, Montgomery's past trauma and separate diagnosis of mental illness were not fully revealed until after her conviction. This led critics including Guardian journalist David Rose to argue that Duchardt provided an incompetent legal defense for Montgomery. Fenner required Duchardt to be cross-examined in November 2016. Duchardt rejected all criticism and defended his conduct.

Subsequent legal proceedings 
On March 19, 2012, the U.S. Supreme Court denied Montgomery's certiorari petition. Montgomery, who was registered for the Federal Bureau of Prisons under number 11072-031, was incarcerated at Federal Medical Center, Carswell in Fort Worth, Texas, where she remained until she was transferred to the site of her execution. For a long time, she was the only woman with a federal death sentence at Federal Medical Center, Carswell (FMC Carswell).

During her appeals, Montgomery's lawyers argued that she technically did not commit the crime of kidnapping resulting in death, claiming that Victoria Jo Stinnett was not considered a person until she was removed from her mother's womb. Accordingly, since Bobbi had died beforehand, the crime was instead a "death resulting in kidnapping." That claim was dismissed, with the courts saying the felony murder rule nullified this and that Montgomery needed to kill Bobbi regardless in order to complete the kidnapping.

Experts who examined Montgomery after conviction concluded that by the time of her crime she had long been living with psychosis, bipolar disorder, and post-traumatic stress disorders. She was said to be often disassociated from reality and to have permanent brain damage from numerous beatings at the hands of her parents and spouses. The case of Atkins v. Virginia ruled that executing individuals with intellectual disability violates the Eighth Amendment to the United States Constitution regarding cruel and unusual punishments. Given this ruling, it could be expected that Montgomery was ineligible for a death sentence. Very strong and undisputed evidence can lead to a withdrawal of the death sentence or a further enquiry into it. Montgomery was scheduled for execution on December 8, 2020, by lethal injection at the U.S. Penitentiary in Terre Haute, Indiana, but this was delayed following her attorneys contracting COVID-19. On December 23, 2020, Montgomery was given a new execution date of January 12, 2021. U.S. District Court Judge Randolph Moss found that "the director's order setting a new execution date while the Court's stay was in effect was 'not in accordance with law'", prohibiting the re-scheduling of the execution before January 1, 2022.

On January 1, a three-judge panel on the U.S. Court of Appeals for the District of Columbia Circuit vacated Moss's ruling, effectively reinstating her execution date of January 12. On that date, federal judge Patrick Hanlon granted a stay of her execution on the grounds that her mental competence must first be tested as it could be argued she did not understand the grounds for her execution, per the Eighth Amendment to the U.S. Constitution. The stay was then vacated by the Supreme Court via a 6–3 vote. The execution was ordered to be carried out immediately. She arrived in Terre Haute's death row on January 12.

Execution 
Montgomery was executed by lethal injection on January 13, 2021, at the United States Penitentiary in Terre Haute, Indiana. When asked if she had any last words, she replied: "No." She was pronounced dead at 1:31 a.m. EST.

Montgomery became the first female federal prisoner executed in 67 years, the first woman executed in the United States since Kelly Gissendaner in 2015, and the first person executed in the United States in 2021. Only three other women have been executed by the U.S. federal government: Mary Surratt, by hanging in 1865; Ethel Rosenberg by electric chair in 1953; and Bonnie Heady by gas chamber, also in 1953. Montgomery's execution was followed a day later by Corey Johnson, and three days later by Dustin Higgs. They were the last three executions under the presidency of Donald Trump, occurring in a lame-duck period. All three were carried out by the United States federal government, each being controversial for a variety of reasons.

Jessica Lussenhop of the BBC stated that most Skidmore residents supported Montgomery's execution.

In her final days, Montgomery had kept a calendar marked with Joe Biden's inauguration date. Joe Biden had promised to enact a moratorium on capital punishment at the federal level.

Aftermath 
Members of the Nodaway-Holt High Class of 2000 have a yearly memorial donation drive for Stinnett.

In popular culture 
The case was described in author Diane Fanning's Baby Be Mine books, and M. William Phelps's Murder in the Heartland. The case featured in an episode of the true crime series Deadly Women titled "Fatal Obsession", in an episode of the true crime series Solved titled "Life and Death", and in the fifth episode of the documentary series No One Saw a Thing that aired on the Sundance Channel on August 29, 2019. The artist Jasper Schalks made a song about the life of Lisa Montgomery titled "the Ballad of Lisa Marie Montgomery".

See also 

 Capital punishment by the United States federal government
 List of people executed by the United States federal government
 List of people executed in the United States in 2021
 List of women executed in the United States since 1976

References

External links 
 United States of America vs. Lisa M. Montgomery
 U.S. v. Lisa Montgomery – F.B.I. Affidavit in Support of Criminal Complaint
 USA v. Lisa Montgomery Department of Justice Information
 Picture of Stinnett from www.uniontribune.net

Violence against women in the United States
Nodaway County, Missouri
2004 murders in the United States
2004 in Missouri
December 2004 crimes
December 2004 events in the United States
Murder in Missouri
Kidnapping in the United States
2004 in Kansas
Kidnapping in the 2000s